is a single by Japanese pop singer Miho Komatsu It was released on 25 June 2003 under the Giza Studio. The single reached #30 in its first week and sold 5,873 copies. It charted for 3 weeks and sold 7,413 copies in total.

Track listing
All songs are written and composed by Miho Komatsu and arranged by Akihito Tokunaga (Doa).

 (instrumental)
 (instrumental)

References 

2003 singles
Miho Komatsu songs
Songs written by Miho Komatsu
2003 songs
Giza Studio singles
Being Inc. singles
Song recordings produced by Daiko Nagato